The 1967 Pittsburgh Steelers season was the team's 35th in the National Football League.

Roster

Regular season

Schedule

Game summaries

Week 1 (Sunday September 17, 1967): Chicago Bears 

at Pitt Stadium, Pittsburgh, Pennsylvania

 Game time: 3:45 p.m. EDT
 Game weather: Snow
 Game attendance: 53,565
 Referee: 
 TV announcers:

Scoring Drives:

 Pittsburgh – FG Clark 41 3–0
 Chicago – Sayers 103 kickoff return (kick blocked) 3–6
 Chicago – R. Taylor 37 fumble return (Percival kick)3–13
 Pittsburgh – Hilton 43 pass from Nelsen (Clark kick)10–13
 Pittsburgh – Asbury 1 run (Clark kick)17–13
 Pittsburgh – Bivins 2 run (Clark kick)24–13
 Pittsburgh – FG Clark 39 27–13
 Pittsburgh – Asbury 1 run (Clark kick)34–13
 Pittsburgh – Compton 6 pass form Nelsen (Clark kick)41–13

Week 2 (Sunday September 24, 1967): St. Louis Cardinals  

at Pitt Stadium, Pittsburgh, Pennsylvania

 Game time: 5:15 p.m. EDT
 Game weather: Fair 
 Game attendance: 45,579
 Referee: 
 TV announcers:

Scoring Drives:

 St. Louis – FG Bakken 18 0–3
 St. Louis – FG Bakken 24 0–6
 St. Louis – Hart 23 run (Bakken kick)0–13
 St. Louis – FG Bakken 33 0–16
 Pittsburgh – Anderson 5 pass from Nelsen (Clark kick) 7–16
 St. Louis – FG Bakken 29  7–19
 Pittsburgh – Asbury 1 run (Clark kick)14–19
 St. Louis – FG Bakken 24 14–22
 St. Louis – FG Bakken 32 14–25
 St. Louis – FG Bakken 23 14–28
Jim Bakken sets then NFL record with 7 field goals.

Week 3 (Sunday October 1, 1967): Philadelphia Eagles  

at Franklin Field, Philadelphia, Pennsylvania

 Game time: 3:00 p.m. EDT 
 Game weather: Windy 
 Game attendance: 60,335
 Referee: Bud Brubaker
 TV announcers:

Scoring Drives:

 Pittsburgh – Asbury 25 run (Clark kick)7–0
 Philadelphia – Lang 5 pass from Snead (Baker kick)7–7
 Philadelphia – FG Baker 36 7–10
 Philadelphia – Hawkins 29 pass from Snead (Baker kick)7–17
 Pittsburgh – Hoak 4 run (Clark kick)14–17
 Philadelphia – Kelly 4 pass from Snead (Baker kick)14–24
 Pittsburgh – FG Clark 24 17–24
 Pittsburgh – Wilburn 18 pass from Nix (Clark kick)24–24
 Philadelphia – Hawkins 8 pass from Snead (Baker kick)24–31
 Philadelphia – FG Baker 35 24–34

Week 4 (Saturday October 7, 1967): Cleveland Browns  

at Cleveland Municipal Stadium, Cleveland, Ohio

 Game time: 3:00 p.m. EDT 
 Game weather: Fair 
 Game attendance: 82,949
 Referee: Pat Haggerty
 TV announcers:

Scoring Drives:

 Pittsburgh – FG Clark 43 3–0
 Cleveland – Warfield 17 pass from Ryan (Groza kick)3–7
 Cleveland – Smith 49 pass from Ryan (Groza kick)3–14
 Pittsburgh – Hoak 8 pass from Nix (Clark kick)10–14
 Cleveland – E. Green 15 pass from Ryan (Groza kick)10–21

Week 5 (Sunday October 15, 1967): New York Giants  

at Pitt Stadium, Pittsburgh, Pennsylvania

 Game time: 4:30 p.m. EDT 
 Game weather: Rain 
 Game attendance: 39,782
 Referee: 
 TV announcers:

Scoring Drives:

 New York – Morrison 19 pass from Tarkenton (Mercein kick)0–7
 Pittsburgh – Nix 1 run (Clark kick)7–7
 New York Giants – Morrall 1 run (Mercein kick)7–14
 Pittsburgh – Shy 27 pass from Nix (Clark kick)14–14
 Pittsburgh – FG Clark 22 17–14
 Pittsburgh – Hilton 8 pass from Nix (Clark kick)24–14
 New York Giants – Tarkenton 7 run (kick failed)24–20
 New York Giants – Morrison 59 pass from Tarkenton (Harris kick)24–27

Week 6 (Sunday October 22, 1967): Dallas Cowboys  

at Pitt Stadium, Pittsburgh, Pennsylvania

 Game time: 3:15 p.m. EDT 
 Game weather: Calm 
 Game attendance: 39,641
 Referee: 
 TV announcers:

Scoring Drives:

 Dallas – Hayes 55 pass from Morton (Villanueva kick)0–7
 Dallas – Hayes – 35 pass from Morton (Villanueva kick)0–14
 Pittsburgh – Hilton 5 pass from Nix (Clark kick)7–14
 Pittsburgh – Nix 1 run (Clark kick)14–14
 Dallas – FG Villanueva 34 14–17
 Pittsburgh – Wilburn 11 pass from Nix (Clark kick)21–17
 Dallas – Norman 5 pass from Morton (Villanueva kick)21–24

Week 7 (Sunday October 29, 1967): New Orleans Saints  

at Tulane Stadium, New Orleans, Louisiana

 Game time: 3:00 p.m. EDT 
 Game weather: Fair 
 Game attendance: 68,912
 Referee: 
 TV announcers:

Scoring Drives:

 New Orleans – FG Durkee 37 0–3
 New Orleans – Taylor 2 run (Durkee kick)0–10
 Pittsburgh – Wilburn 5 pass from Nelsen (Clark kick)7–10
 Pittsburgh – Shy 33 run (Clark kick)14–10

Week 8 (Sunday November 5, 1967): Cleveland Browns  

at Pitt Stadium, Pittsburgh, Pennsylvania

 Game time: 7:15 p.m. EDT 
 Game weather: Fair 
 Game attendance: 47,131
 Referee: Tommy Bell
 TV announcers:

Scoring Drives:

 Cleveland – Collins 3 pass from Ryan (Groza kick)0–7
 Cleveland – Kelly 41 pass from Ryan (Groza kick)0–14
 Cleveland – Davis 52 punt return (Groza kick)0–21
 Pittsburgh – Jefferson 18 pass from Nelsen (Clark kick)7–21
 Cleveland – FG Groza 37 7–24
 Cleveland – E. Green 27 run (Groza kick)7–31
 Cleveland – FG Groza 35 7–34
 Pittsburgh – Wilburn 13 pass from Nelsen (Clark kick)14–34

Week 9 (Sunday November 12, 1967): St. Louis Cardinals  

at Busch Memorial Stadium, St. Louis, Missouri

 Game time: 3:45 p.m. EDT 
 Game weather: Fair 
 Game attendance: 47,994
 Referee: 
 TV announcers:

Scoring Drives:

 Pittsburgh – Shy 4 run (Clark kick)7–0
 St. Louis – Roland 2 run (Bakken kick)7–7
 St. Louis – Smith 6 pass from Hart (Bakken kick)7–14
 Pittsburgh – Jefferson 6 pass from Nelsen (Clark kick)14–14

Week 10 (Sunday November 19, 1967): New York Giants  

at Yankee Stadium, The Bronx, New York

 Game time: 12:15 p.m. EDT 
 Game weather: Snow 
 Game attendance: 62,892
 Referee: 
 TV announcers:

Scoring Drives:

 Pittsburgh – FG Clark 44 0–3
 Pittsburgh – FG Clark 10 0–6
 New York Giants – Thomas 35 pass from Tarkenton (Gogolak kick)6–7
 New York Giants – Minniear 6 pass from Tarkenton (Gogolak kick)6–14
 Pittsburgh – Jefferson 58 pass from Nelsen (Clark kick)13–14
 New York Giants – Koy 1 run (Gogolak kick)13–21
 New York Giants – Minniear 1 run (Gogolak kick)13–28
 Pittsburgh – Hilton 10 pass from Nelsen (Clark kick)20–28

Week 11 (Sunday November 26, 1967): Minnesota Vikings  

at Pitt Stadium, Pittsburgh, Pennsylvania

 Game time: 3:15 p.m. EDT 
 Game weather: Windy 
 Game attendance: 32,773
 Referee: 
 TV announcers:

Scoring Drives:

 Minnesota – FG Cox 44 0–3
 Pittsburgh – Anderson 20 pass from Hoak (Clark kick)7–3
 Pittsburgh – FG Clark 47 10–3
 PIttsburgh – FG Clark 26 13–3
 Minnesota – Osborn 27 pass from Kapp (Cox kick) 13–10
 Minnesota – Beasley 2 pass from Kapp (Cox kick)13–17
 Pittsburgh – Jefferson 12 pass from Nelsen (Clark kick)20–17
 Minnesota – Hargrove blocked punt recovery (Cox kick)20–24
 Minnesota – Mackbee 32 interception return (Cox kick)20–31
 Minnesota – Kapp 11 run (Cox kick)20–38
 Minnesota – FG Cox 34 20–41
 Pittsburgh – Kortas 5 fumble return (Clark kick)27–41

Week 12 (Sunday December 3, 1967): Detroit Lions  

at Tiger Stadium, Detroit, Michigan

 Game time: 6:45 p.m. EDT 
 Game weather: Snow 
 Game attendance: 47,713
 Referee: 
 TV announcers:

Scoring Drives:

 Pittsburgh – Shy 1 run (Clark kick)7–0
 Pittsburgh – Shy 1 run (Clark kick)14–0
 Pittsburgh – Wilburn 66 pass from Nix (Clark kick)21–0
 Detroit – Farr 3 pass from Plum (Walker kick)21–7
 Pittsburgh – FG Clark 17 24–7
 Detroit – Nowatzke 3 run (Yepremian kick)24–14

Week 13 (Sunday December 10, 1967): Washington Redskins  

at Pitt Stadium, Pittsburgh, Pennsylvania

 Game time: 12:00 p.m. EDT 
 Game weather: Fair 
 Game attendance: 22,251
 Referee: 
 TV announcers:

Scoring Drives:

 Washington – Whitfield 2 run (Alford kick)0–7
 Washington – Safety, Breding blocked punt in end zone 0–9
 Pittsburgh – FG Clark 20 3–9
 Pittsburgh – Hilton 3 pass from Nix (Clark kick)10–9
 Washington – Taylor 33 pass from Jurgensen (kick blocked)10–15

Week 14 (Sunday December 17, 1967): Green Bay Packers  

at Lambeau Field, Green Bay, Wisconsin

 Game time: 2:05 P.M. EDT 
 Game weather: Snow 
 Game attendance: 50,861
 Referee: 
 TV announcers:

Scoring Drives:

 Pittsburgh – McGee 21 interception return (Clark kick)7–0
 Green Bay – FG Chandler 25 7–3
 Pittsburgh – Gros 22 run (Clark kick)14–3
 Green Bay – Williams 29 pass from Horn (Chandler kick)14–10
 Pittsburgh – FG Clark 27 17–10
 Pittsburgh – Hinton 27 fumble return (Clark kick)24–10
 Green Bay – Williams 25 run (Chandler kick)24–17

Standings

References

External links
 1967 Pittsburgh Steelers season at Profootballreference.com 
 1967 Pittsburgh Steelers season statistics at jt-sw.com 

Pittsburgh Steelers seasons
Pittsburgh Steelers
Pittsburgh Steel